War Memorial Museum may refer to:

 War Memorial Museum, formerly Confederate Memorial Museum, in Columbus, Texas, United States
 War Memorial of Korea, in Yongsan-dong, Yongsan-gu, Seoul, South Korea